Costa Adeje is a coastal part of a town and municipality in the southwestern part of the island of Tenerife, one of the Canary Islands, and part of the province of Adeje, Santa Cruz de Tenerife, Spain.  The Bahai del Duque was constructed in 1993 Casa del Duque was built by the Duke of Abrantes in 1930s and Casa Fuerte in 1553. Casa del Duque was occupied by Rafael Puig Lluvina who developed Costa Adeje in 1966.

Beaches 
Adeje beaches include:
 Playa Fañabé
 Playa del Duque
 Playa de Torviscas
 Playa la Pinta
 Playa Ajabo
 Playa San Juan

References

External links

Tenerife